Environmental modelling is the creation and use of mathematical models of the environment. Environmental modelling may be used purely for research purposes, and improved understanding of environmental systems, or for providing an interdisciplinary analysis that can inform decision making and policy.

See also
 Environmental niche modelling
 Environmental informatics
 Ecosystem model

References